Tue West  (born 1977) is a Danish composer and musician. He released six solo albums in Danish and one English album with the trio "Jaruni, Moura and Wesko"

Discography

Albums
2003: Tue West (Universal)
2005: Meldingen kommer (Universal)
2008: Vi er nået hertil (Universal)
2010: Lige ved og næsten (EMI)
2011: Ikke regulere mere (VME)
2016: Der er ingen der venter på os (Target)

See also
List of Danish composers

References

External links
Official homepage

Danish composers
Male composers
1977 births
Living people